Vanikoro kilburni is a species of very small sea snail, a marine gastropod mollusk in the family Vanikoridae.

Description

Distribution
This species occurs in the Indian Ocean in the Mascarene Basin.

References

 Drivas, J. & M. Jay (1988). Coquillages de La Réunion et de l'île Maurice

Vanikoridae